Köbər Zəyzid (also, Köbər Zəyit, Köbər Zəyzit, Kabar Zeyzit, and Koverzeyzit) is a village and municipality in the Shaki Rayon of Azerbaijan. It has a population of 921.

References 

Populated places in Shaki District